The Kuala Lumpur Open Squash Championships is an annual squash tournament held in Kuala Lumpur, Malaysia. The tournament is sponsored by CIMB.

Men's championship

Women's championship

See also
 Malaysian Open Squash Championships
 British Open Squash Championships
 British Junior Open Squash
 World Open

References
 
 
 
 
 
 

Squash tournaments in Malaysia
Squash records and statistics
Squash in Malaysia